Verrucaria rupestris is a species of lichen belonging to the family Verrucariaceae.

See also
 List of Verrucaria species

References

rupestris
Lichen species
Taxa named by Heinrich Schrader (botanist)
Lichens described in 1794